Schefflenz is a river of Baden-Württemberg, Germany. It passes through the village Schefflenz and flows into the Jagst near Untergriesheim.

See also
List of rivers of Baden-Württemberg

References

Rivers of Baden-Württemberg
Rivers of Germany